Mahottari District, a part of Madhesh Province, is one of the seventy-seven districts of Nepal. Its headquarters is located in Jaleshwar, a neighbouring town of the historical city of Janakpur. The name Jaleshwar means the 'God in Water'. One can find a famous temple of Lord Shiva in Water there. Jaleshwar lies at a few kilometres distance from the Nepal-India border and has a majority Maithili population.

Geography and climate

Demographics
At the time of the 2021 Nepal census, Mahottari District had a population of 705,838. Of these, 80.7% spoke Maithili, 7.3% Urdu, 5.6% Nepali, 1.9% Magar, 1.4% Tamang, 1.1% Tharu and 0.9% Magahi as their first language.

35.1% of the population in the district spoke Hindi, 23.0% Nepali, 3.6% Maithili and 1.3% Urdu as their second language.

Notable people  
List ordered alphabetically
 Bhadrakali Mishra- Nepali Congress leader of Minister of Nepal at various times
 Giriraj Mani Pokharel-CPN (Maoist Centre) leader and former Minister for Education
 Hari Shankar Mishra- Current governor of Madhesh Province, former Nepali Congress leader and Member of House of Representatives
 Mahantha Thakur- Chairman of Democratic Socialist Party and former Minister for various ministries as NC leader 
 Mahendra Kumar Raya- Nepali Congress leader and former Minister of state for Industry, Commerce and Supplies under Bimalendra Nidhi
 Maheshwar Prasad Singh- democracy icon and Nepali Congress leader 
 Ram Narayan Mishra- Nepali Congress leader and minister in first democratically elected government of BP Koirala
 Sharat Singh Bhandari- former NC leader and senior leader of DSP, N. Also former Minister for Defence
 Shivajee Yadav-Deputy chairman of People's Progressive Party and former member of constituent assembly

Administration 
The district consists of ten urban municipalities and five rural municipalities. These are as follows:

 Aurahi Municipality
 Balawa Municipality
 Bardibas Municipality
 Bhangaha Municipality
 Gaushala Municipality
 Jaleshwor Municipality
 Loharpatti Municipality
 ManaraShiswa Municipality
Matihani Municipality
 Ramgopalpur Municipality
 Ekdara Rural Municipality
 Mahottari Rural Municipality
 Pipara Rural Municipality
 Samsi Rural Municipality
 Sonama Rural Municipality

Former Village Development Committees (VDCs) and Municipalities

The 2011 National Population and Housing Census by the government of Nepal identifies 77 municipalities and village development committees (VDC) within the Mahottari District.

Anakar
Aurahi
Bagada
Banchauri
Badiya
Bairgiya Laksminiya
Balawa
Banauli Donauli
Banauta
Bardibas Municipality
Basabitti
Bathnaha
Belgachhi
Bhangaha
Bharatpur
Bhatauliya
Bijayalpura
Bhramarpura
Damhi Marai
Dhamaura
Dharmapur
Dhirapur
Ekadarabela
Ekarahiya
Etaharwakatti
Gaidha Bhetpur
Gauribas

Gaushala Municipality
Gonarpura
Halkhori
Hariharpur Harinmari
Hathilet
Hatisarwa
Jaleshwar Municipality
Khairbanni
Khaya Mara
Khopi
Khuttapipradhi
Kisan Nagar
Kolhusa Bagaiya
Laksminiya
Loharpatti
Mahadaiyatapanpur
Mahottari
Maisthan
Majhaura Vishnupur
Manara
Matihani
Meghanath Gorhanna
Nainhi
Nigaul
Padaul
Parsa Pateli
Parsadewadh

Pashupatinagar
Phulahatta Parikauli
Phulakaha
Pigauna
Pipra
Pokharibhinda Samgrampur
Raghunathpur
Ramgopalpur
Ramnagar
Ratauli
Ratauli 9 Rahmanpur
Sahasaula
Sahorawa
Samdha
Sarpallo
Shamsi
Sripur
Simardahi
Singyahi
Sisawakataiya
Sonama
sonamai bhoil
Sonaum
Suga Bhawani
Sundarpur
Mangalnath, Magarthana

 

 

 
Districts of Nepal established during Rana regime or before
Districts of Madhesh Province